Adam Leith Gollner is a Canadian writer and musician who lives in Montreal. He has written two books, and is the former editor of Vice Magazine. Gollner has also played in bands including We Are Molecules, Dessert, and the Hot Pockets.

Early life
Gollner was born and raised in Canada, and went to Royal West Academy.

Career
The Fruit Hunters
Gollner's first book, The Fruit Hunters: A Story of Nature, Adventure, Commerce and Obsession was published by Charles Scribner's Sons in the United States,  Doubleday in Canada, and Larousse in Brazil. The book inspired a 2012 documentary film, directed by Yung Chang.

The Book of Immortality
Goller's second book, The Book of Immortality: The Science, Belief, and Magic Behind Living Forever was published by Charles Scribner's Sons in the United States and Doubleday in Canada. The book won the 2013 Mavis Gallant Prize for Non-Fiction.

Editing, writing
Gollner was the editor of Vice magazine, and he has written for The New York Times, Gourmet, The Globe and Mail, Bon Appétit, Good Magazine, V magazine, Maclean's, Orion, Maisonneuve, The Budapest Sun, The Gravy, Ugly Things, En Route and the Saturday Post. His byline is sometimes Adam Gollner, often Adam Leith Gollner, and occasionally Glenda Molar.

Music
Gollner has also played in bands including We Are Molecules, Dessert, and the Hot Pockets. He co-wrote and co-produced, alongside Nick Diamonds of The Unicorns and Islands, and Steven McDonald of Redd Kross, the UNICEF benefit song "Do They Know It's Halloween."

Bibliography

Books

Essays and reporting

References

External links
 Adam Gollner

1976 births
Living people
Place of birth missing (living people)
Anglophone Quebec people
Canadian non-fiction writers
Canadian rock musicians
Musicians from Montreal
Vanity Fair (magazine) people